Robert E. Cohen (born January 21, 1947) is an American chemical engineer currently at Massachusetts Institute of Technology.

In 2010, Cohen was elected a member of the National Academy of Engineering for research on polymer morphology and surfaces, commercial products and processes, successful entrepreneurship, and novel educational programs. He is also a member of the American Institute of Chemical Engineers.

References

Living people
MIT School of Engineering faculty
American chemical engineers
Cornell University alumni
California Institute of Technology alumni
Fellows of the American Institute of Chemical Engineers
1947 births